The Union County Courthouse on Court St. in Clayton, New Mexico is a historic building built in 1909.  It has been described as having World's Fair Classic Style architecture.  It was listed on the National Register of Historic Places in 1987.

The courthouse was one of 14 studied in a 1987 review of historic courthouses in New Mexico.

See also

National Register of Historic Places listings in Union County, New Mexico

References

National Register of Historic Places in Union County, New Mexico
Government buildings completed in 1909
Buildings and structures in Union County, New Mexico
Courthouses on the National Register of Historic Places in New Mexico